Tsogt (mighty) is a sum (district) of Govi-Altai Province in western Mongolia. In the part of the sum territory that overlaps with the Gobi desert, there is a settlement called Bayantooroi. In 2009, its population was 3,697.

References 

Populated places in Mongolia
Districts of Govi-Altai Province